Ehavere is a village in Jõgeva Parish, Jõgeva County in eastern Estonia.

Archeologist Harri Moora (1900–1968) was born in Ehavere.

References
 

Villages in Jõgeva County